Jeanne Chinn is an American actress and model. She appeared in ER, Charmed, and According To Jim. She also co-starred in Code Name Phoenix along with Jeffrey Meek. She worked at various sub shops and shoe stores before becoming an actress and model. She is a rookie of Jeet Kune Do.

Filmography

Television
ER as Jennifer
Charmed as Anling
According To Jim as Jody Chen
Curb Your Enthusiasm as Barbara Schneider in the "Car Salesman", episode 1 of season 2.

Movies

Lethal Weapon 4 as Ping's mother
Shopping for Fangs as Katherine Nguyen
Target Audience 9.1 as Gillian
R.S.V.P. as Cricket

References

External links
 Official Website of Jeanne Chinn
 Film Reference
 

American film actresses
American television actresses
Living people
Year of birth missing (living people)
21st-century American women
Actresses of Asian descent